Learning the World is a science fiction novel by British writer Ken MacLeod, published in 2005.  It won the 2006 Prometheus Award, was nominated for the Hugo, Locus, Clarke, and Campbell Awards that same year, and received a BSFA nomination in 2005.  Since the book's publication MacLeod has written two short stories set in the same universe, "Lighting Out" and "Who's Afraid of Wolf 359?".

Plot

The novel is a first contact story, following the generation ship But the Sky, My Lady! The Sky! as it approaches the Destiny Star. Humans have been colonizing the 500 light-years around Earth for a few thousand years, and have never run into a sentient alien species — until now. The discovery of an Industrial Age alien race upsets the established protocols of the ship, leading to uncertainty and delays in habitation, which in turn leads to societal unrest and conflict aboard the ship.

Reception
Carl Hays in his review for Booklist said that "MacLeod continues to dazzle readers with vividly rendered landscapes of technological splendor and fascinating yet plausible visions of humanity's future."  Kirkus Reviews writes "MacLeod flips back and forth between stories of the humans and aliens, avoiding the usual pro-human slant and presenting both sides as equally complex. And as humans advance on their planet, the aliens are beginning to wonder why their slave race, the "trudges," is starting to act uppity."  Ted Rose in his review for Entertainment Weekly described this novel as "a compelling first-contact scenario, but MacLeod's confusing characters lead to a lackluster close encounter."

References to other works
In the novel MacLeod uses "alien space bats", a science fiction MacGuffin, as characters in the novel as an in-joke. Further, the text of the novel is inter-larded with re-contextualised quotations from the works of other famous science fiction writers.

Notes

External links
 
 Review, Learning The World
 Learning the World at Worlds Without End

2005 British novels
2005 science fiction novels
Novels by Ken MacLeod
Generation ships in fiction
Orbit Books books